The Torres de Satélite ("Satellite Towers") are a group of sculptures located in the Ciudad Satélite district of Naucalpan, State of Mexico. One of the country's first urban sculptures of great dimensions, had its planning started in 1957 with the ideas of renowned Mexican architect Luis Barragán, painter Jesús Reyes Ferreira and sculptor Mathias Goeritz. The project was originally planned to be composed of seven towers, with the tallest one reaching a height of 200 meters (about 650 feet), but a budget reduction forced the design to be composed of only five towers, with the tallest measuring 52 meters (170 feet) and the shortest 30 meters (98 feet).

Goeritz originally wanted the towers to be painted in different shades of orange, but changed his mind later due to some pressure from constructors and investors. It was finally decided that there would be one tower each in red, blue and yellow, the primary subtractive colors, and two in white.

Thus, in the first days of March 1958, the Satélite Towers were inaugurated as the symbol of the newborn and modern Ciudad Satélite.

In popular culture
The towers appear prominently in the surrealist film The Holy Mountain by Alejandro Jodorowsky. The unnamed protagonist is hoisted up the red tower, which he then enters via a circular hole in its side (painted on for the purposes of the film). Within he encounters an Alchemist, and begins a metaphysical transformation.

References

External links
—Ayuntamiento de Naucalpan de Juárez — Official website.

1958 sculptures
Architecture in Mexico
History of the State of Mexico
Landscape design history
Modernist architecture in Mexico
Satelite